Lord Kennet may refer to:

 Robert Bruce, Lord Kennet (1718–1785), Scottish advocate, legal scholar and judge
 Baron Kennet, of the Dene in the County of Wiltshire, is a title in the Peerage of the United Kingdom
 (Edward) Hilton Young, 1st Baron Kennet (1879–1960), British politician and writer
 Wayland Hilton Young, 2nd Baron Kennet (1923–2009), British writer, Labour Party and SDP politician who served in numerous national and international official and unofficial capacities